Greenfield, also known as Col. William Preston Plantation, Preston House, and Botetourt Center at Greenfield, is a historic plantation site located at Fincastle, Botetourt County, Virginia. It is the site of a large forced-labor farm AKA enslaved people established in the mid-18th century by Colonel William Preston (1729-1783) before he moved to Smithfield in 1774.  The plantation house was destroyed by fire in 1959.  The remaining buildings are kitchen/quarters (c. 1832) and saddlebag slave dwelling (c. 1850).

It was listed on the National Register of Historic Places in 2011, and was delisted in 2022.

References

Plantation houses in Virginia
Houses on the National Register of Historic Places in Virginia
Houses completed in 1832
Buildings and structures in Botetourt County, Virginia
National Register of Historic Places in Botetourt County, Virginia
Burned houses in the United States
1832 establishments in Virginia
Preston family of Virginia
Former National Register of Historic Places in Virginia